Nakarehas na Puso is a Philippine television drama series broadcast by GMA Network. Directed by Gil Tejada, Jr., it stars Jean Garcia. It premiered on September 26, 2022 on the network's Afternoon Prime line up, replacing The Fake Life. The series concluded on January 13, 2023 with a total of 80 episodes. It was replaced by Underage on its timeslot.

The series is streaming online on YouTube.

Premise 
Amelia Galang loses sight of her husband and four children after being jailed. When Galang gets released, she finds out that her family has broken up and her children and husband now despise her.

Cast and characters
Lead cast
 Jean Garcia as Amelia Galang / Hilda Cruz

Supporting cast
 Vaness del Moral as Natalia "Lea" Galang-Divino
 EA Guzman as Ramiro Jesus "Miro" Galang
 Claire Castro as Olivia "Olive" Galang / Divine Balbastro
 Michelle Aldana as Doris Montellana
 Leandro Baldemor as Jackson "Jack" Galang
 Ashley Sarmiento as Anica Marie "Nica" Galang-Divino 
 Bryce Eusebio as Warren Angeles
 Glenda Garcia as Vivian "Madam V" Samonte
 Chanel Latorre as Racquel Angeles
 Analyn Barro as Charlotte Cruz-Galang
 Dang Cruz as Glory Vituda

Guest cast
 Barbara Miguel as young Lea
 Miggs Cuaderno as young Miro
 Cassy Lavarias as young Olive
 Franchesco Maafi as Winston "Nonoy" Galang
 David Racelis as Ivan Divino
 Marnie Lapus as Julie Balbastro
 Kenken Nuyad as Argel
 Madeleine Nicolas as Rustica Monte
 Janna Trias as Barang
 Euwenn Mikael Aleta as Bombert
 Dennah Bautista as Bekbek
 Ynez Veneracion as Lady Mamba
 Justine Garcia as Gedaville
 Paul Ryan Aquino as Poknat

Episodes
<onlyinclude>

References

External links
 
 

2022 Philippine television series debuts
2023 Philippine television series endings
Filipino-language television shows
GMA Network drama series
Television shows set in the Philippines